Daniel Boone Arboretum is an arboretum located along a portion of the Daniel Boone Greenway in Harrogate, Tennessee.

The arboretum contains over 50 labeled species of native trees.

See also
 Daniel Boone Native Gardens (Boone, North Carolina)
 List of botanical gardens in the United States

Arboreta in Tennessee
Botanical gardens in Tennessee
Protected areas of Claiborne County, Tennessee
Harrogate, Tennessee